Northwest Semitic is a division of the Semitic languages comprising the indigenous languages of the Levant. It emerged from Proto-Semitic in the Early Bronze Age. It is first attested in proper names identified as Amorite in the Middle Bronze Age. The oldest coherent texts are in Ugaritic, dating to the Late Bronze Age, which by the time of the Bronze Age collapse are joined by Old Aramaic, and by the Iron Age by Sutean and the Canaanite languages (Phoenician/Punic, Edomite, Moabite and Hebrew).

The term was coined by Carl Brockelmann in 1908, who separated Fritz Hommel's 1883 classification of Semitic languages into Northwest (Canaanite and Aramaic), East Semitic (Akkadian, its Assyrian and Babylonian dialects, Eblaite) and Southwest (Arabic, Old South Arabian languages and Abyssinian).

Brockelmann's Canaanite sub-group includes Ugaritic, Phoenician and Hebrew. Some scholars would now separate Ugaritic as a separate branch of Northwest Semitic alongside Canaanite.

Central Semitic is a proposed intermediate group comprising Northwest Semitic and Arabic.
Central Semitic is either a subgroup of West Semitic or a top-level division of Semitic alongside East Semitic and South Semitic. SIL Ethnologue in its system of classification (of living languages only) eliminates Northwest Semitic entirely by joining Canaanite and Arabic in a "South-Central" group which together with Aramaic forms Central Semitic. The Deir Alla Inscription and Samalian have been identified as language varieties falling outside Aramaic proper but with some similarities to it, possibly in an "Aramoid" or "Syrian" subgroup.

It is clear that the Taymanitic script expressed a distinct linguistic variety that is not Arabic and not closely related to Hismaic or Safaitic, while it can tentatively be suggested that it was more closely related to Northwest Semitic.

Historical development

The time period for the split of Northwest Semitic from Proto-Semitic or from other Semitic groups is uncertain, it has been recently suggested by Richard C. Steiner that the earliest attestation of Northwest Semitic is to be found in snake spells from the Egyptian Pyramid Texts, dating to the mid-third millennium BCE. Amorite personal names and words in Akkadian and Egyptian texts from the late third millennium to the mid-second millennium BCE and the language of the Proto-Sinaitic inscriptions dated to the first half of the second millennium otherwise constitute the earliest traces of Northwest Semitic, the first Northwest Semitic language attested in full being Ugaritic in the 14th century BCE.

During the early 1st millennium, the Phoenician language was spread throughout the Mediterranean by Phoenician colonists, most notably to Carthage in today's Tunisia. The Phoenician alphabet is of fundamental importance in human history as the source and ancestor of the Greek alphabet, the later Latin alphabet, the Aramaic (Square Hebrew), Syriac, and Arabic writing systems, Germanic runes, and ultimately Cyrillic.

From the 8th century BCE, the use of Imperial Aramaic by the Neo-Assyrian Empire (935-608 BC) and the succeeding Neo-Babylonian Empire (612-539 BC) and Achaemenid Empire (539-332 BC), a form of the Aramaic language, spread throughout the Northwest Semitic region of the Levant, northern regions of the Arabian peninsula and southern regions of Anatolia, and gradually drove most of the other Northwest Semitic languages to extinction. The ancient Judaeans adopted Aramaic for daily use, and parts of the Tanakh are written in it. Hebrew was preserved, however, as a Jewish liturgical language and language of scholarship, and resurrected in the 19th century, with modern adaptations, to become the Modern Hebrew language of the State of Israel.

After the Muslim conquests of the 7th century, Arabic began to gradually replace Aramaic throughout the region. Aramaic survives today as the liturgical language of the Assyrian Church of the East, Syriac Orthodox Church, Chaldean Catholic Church, and other churches of Assyrian Christians. It is spoken in modern dialects with an estimated 1 million fluent speakers (some such as Assyrian Neo-Aramaic containing archaic Akkadian influence) by endangered indigenous and non-Muslim populations scattered throughout the Middle East, most commonly by Assyrians as well as Gnostic Mandeans and some Levantine Syriac Christians and Jews. There is also an Aramaic substratum in Levantine Arabic.

Phonology

Sound changes

That this same sound became  in Aramaic (although in Ancient Aramaic, it was written with qoph), suggests that Ugaritic is not the parent language of the group. An example of this sound shift can be seen in the word for earth: Ugaritic  (’arṣ), Punic  (’arṣ), Tiberian Hebrew  (’ereṣ), Biblical Hebrew  (’arṣ) and Aramaic  (’ar‘ā’).

The effect of this sound shift can be seen by comparing the following words:

Vowels 
Proto-Northwest Semitic had three contrastive vowel qualities and a length distinction, resulting in six vocalic phonemes: *a, *ā, *i, *ī, *u, and *ū. While *aw, *ay, *iw, *iy, *uw, and *uy are often referred to as diphthongs, they do not seem to have had a different status as such, rather being a normal sequence of a short vowel and a glide.

Consonants 

Suchard proposes that: "*s, both from original *s and original *ṯ, then shifted further back to a postalveolar *š, while deaffrication of *ts and *dz to *s and *z gave these phonemes their Hebrew values, as well as merging original *dz with original *ḏ.

Emphatics 
In Proto-Northwest Semitic the emphatics were articulated with pharyngealization. Its shift to backing (as opposed to Proto-Semitic glottalization of emphatics) has been considered a Central Semitic innovation.

According to Faber, the assimilation *-ṣt->-ṣṭ- in the Dt stem in Hebrew (hiṣṭaddēḳ ‘he declared himself righteous’) suggests backing rather than glottalization. The same assimilation is attested in Aramaic (yiṣṭabba ‘he will be moistened’).

Grammar

Nouns 
Three cases can be reconstructed for Proto-Northwest Semitic nouns (nominative, accusative, genitive), two genders (masculine, feminine) and three numbers (single, dual, plural).

Pronouns 
Proto-Northwest Semitic pronouns had 2 genders and 3 grammatical cases.

Numerals 
Reconstruction of Proto-Northwest Semitic numbers.

Verbs 

The G fientive or G-stem (Hebrew qal) is the basic, most common, unmarked stem. The G-stem expresses events. The vowel of the prefix of the prefix conjugations in Proto-Northwest Semitic was *-a- and the stem was *-qṭul- or *-qṭil-, as in *ya-qṭul-u 'he will kill', while the stem of the suffix conjugation had two *a vowels, as in *qaṭal-a 'he has killed'.

The G stative is like the fientive but expressing states instead of events. The prefix conjugation of stative roots, the vowel of the prefixes was *-i- and it contained and *a vowel, e.g. *yi-kbad-u 'he will become heavy', while the second vowel of the suffix conjugation was either *-i-, as in *kabid-a 'he is/was/will be heavy', or *-u-, as in *ʕamuq-a 'it is/was/will be deep'. Whether the G-stem stative suffix conjugation has *i or *u in the stem is lexically determined.

The N-stem (Hebrew nip̄ʕal) is marked by a prefixed *n(a)-. It is mediopassive which is a grammatical voice that subsumes the meanings of both the middle voice and the passive voice. In other words, it expresses a range of meanings where the subject is the patient of the verb, e.g. passive, medial, and reciprocal. The stem of the suffix conjugation is *naqṭaland the stem of the prefix conjugations is *-nqaṭil-; as is the case with stative Gstem verbs, the prefix vowel is *-i-, resulting in forms like *yi-nqaṭil-u 'he will be killed'.

The D-stem (Hebrew piʕel) is marked by gemination of the second radical in all forms. It has a range of different meanings, mostly transitive. The stem of the suffix conjugation is *qaṭṭil-, and the same stem is used for the prefix conjugations. It is not clear whether the Proto-Northwest-Semitic prefix vowel should be reconstructed as *-u-, the form inherited from Proto-Semitic (i.e. *yuqaṭṭil-u), or as *-a-, which is somewhat supported by evidence from Ugaritic and Hebrew (*yaqaṭṭil-u).

The C-stem (Hebrew hip̄ʕil) more often than not expresses a causative meaning. The most likely reconstructions are *haqṭil- (from older *saqṭil-) for the stem of the suffix conjugation and *-saqṭil- for the stem of the prefix conjugations. The reconstructed prefix vowel is the same as that of the D-stem, and similarly, the participle is to be reconstructed as *musaqṭilum.

All of the stems listed here, except the N-stem, could bring forth further derivation. The "internal passive stems" (Gp, Dp, and Cp; Hebrew passive qal, puʕal, and hɔp̄ʕal) aren't marked by affixes, but express their passivity through a different vowel pattern. The Gp prefix conjugation can be reconstructed as *yu-qṭal-u 'he will be killed'. Reflexive or reciprocal meanings can be expressed by the t-stems, formed with a *t which was either infixed after the first radical (Gt, Ct) or prefixed before it (tD). 

The precise reconstruction are uncertain.

Conjunctions 

 *wa, 'and'
 *pa/ʔap, 'and then, and so'
 *ʔaw, 'or'
 *huʼāti and *hiʼāti, direct object markers
 *ha, 'to, for'
 *ka also *kī, (and *kaj?) 'like, as'
 *bal, 'without, non-'
 *bi, 'in, with'
 *la, 'to, for' (dat/dir)
 *min(V), 'from'
 *ʕad(aj), 'up to, until'
 *ʕal(aj), 'on, against'
 *jiθ, 'there is/are'

Notes

Bibliography
Blau, J.  1968.  "Some Difficulties in the Reconstruction of 'Proto-Hebrew' and 'Proto-Canaanite'," in In Memoriam Paul Kahle.  BZAW, 103. pp. 29–43
Cross, F. M.  1965.  “The Development of the Jewish Scripts,” in The Bible and the Ancient Near East:  Essays in Honor of W. F. Albright, ed. G. E. Wright.  New York.  Reprinted 1965,  Anchor Book Edition;   New York, pp. 133–202.
Cross, F. M.  1967.  “The Origin and Early Evolution of the Alphabet,” EI 5: 8*-24*.
Cross, F. M.  1982.  “Alphabets and pots:  Reflections on typological method in the dating of human artifacts,” MAARAV 3:  121-136.
Cross, F. M. 1989.  “The Invention and Development of the Alphabet,” in The Origins of Writing (ed. W. M. Senner; Lincoln: University of Nebraska), pp. 77–90.
Cross, F. M. and Freedman, D. N.  1952. Early Hebrew Orthography:  A Study of the Epigraphic Evidence New Haven: American Oriental Society.
Daniels, Peter.  1996.  The World’s Writing Systems.  New York:  Oxford.
de Moor, Johannes C.  1988.  "Narrative Poetry in Canaan," UF 20:149-171.
Donner, H. and Rollig, W.  1962-64.  Kanaanäische und aramäische Inschriften.  3 volumes.  Wiesbaden. (5th ed.)
Driver, G. R.  1976.  Semitic Writing:  From Pictograph to Alphabet.  3rd edition.  London.
Garbini, G.  1960.  Il Semitico di nord-ovest.  (And a critique by E.Y. Kutscher, JSS 10 (1965):21-51.)

Garr, R.  1985.  Dialect Geography of Syria-Palestine, 1000-586 B.C.E.   Philadelphia:  UPenn.
Gelb, I. J.  1961.  “The Early History of the West Semitic Peoples,” JCS 15:27-47.
Gelb, I. J.  1963.  A Study of Writing.  2nd edition.  Chicago.
Gibson, J. C. L. 1971-87. Textbook of Syrian Semitic Inscriptions.  3 Vols.  Oxford:  Clarendon.
Ginsberg, H. L.  1970.  “The Northwest Semitic Languages,” in The World History of the Jewish People, volume 1/2: Patriarches. Tel Aviv.
Greenfield, J. C.  1969.  “Amurrite, Ugaritic and Canaanite,” in Proceedings of the International Conference of Semitic Studies.  Jerusalem.  pp. 92–101.
Halpern, B.  1987.  “Dialect Distribution in Canaan and the Deir Alla Inscriptions,” in “Working with No Data”:  Semitic and Egyptian Studies Presented to Thomas O. Lambdin.  Ed. D. M. Golomb.  Winona Lake, IN:  Eisenbrauns.  pp. 119–39.
Harris, Z.  1939.  Development of the Canaanite Dialects.  AOS, 16.  New Haven:  AOS.
Herr, Larry G.  1980.  "The Formal Scripts of Iron Age Transjordan," BASOR 238:21-34.
Hoftijzer, J. and Jongeling, K.  1995.  Dictionary of the North-West Semitic inscriptions. 2 volumes.  Leiden/New York: Brill.  Not including Ugaritic.
Huehnergard, J.  1990. "Remarks on the Classification of the Northwest Semitic Languages," in The Balaam Text from Deir Alla Re-evaluated: proceedings of the international symposium held at Leiden, 21–24 August 1989.  pp. 282–93.
Kaufman, S. A.  1988.  “The Classification of North West Semitic Dialects of the Biblical Period and Some Implications Thereof,” in Proceedings of the Ninth World Congress of Jewish Studies (Panel Sessions:  Hebrew and Aramaic Languages).  Jerusalem:  World Union of Jewish Studies.  pp. 41–57.
Moran, William L.  1961.  “The Hebrew Language in its Northwest Semitic Background,” in The Bible and the Ancient Near East:  Essays in Honor of W. F. Albright, ed. G. E. Wright.  New York.  Reprinted 1965,  Anchor Book Edition;   New York, pp. 59–84.
Moran, William L.  1975.  “The Syrian Scribe of the Jerusalem Amarna Letters,” in Unity and Diversity:  Essays in the History, Literature, and Religion of the Ancient Near East (ed. H. Goedicke and J. J. M. Roberts; Baltimore/London: Johns Hopkins University Press) 146-166.
Moscati, Sabatino, ed.  1969.  An Introduction to the Comparative Grammar of the Semitic Languages: Phonology and Morphology. Porta Linguarum Orientalium, ns, 6. Wiesbaden: Otto Harrassowitz.
Naveh, J.  1987.  Early History of the Alphabet:  An Introduction to West Semitic Epigraphy and Palaeography.  2nd edition.  Jerusalem:  Magnes.  Especially sections on West Semitic.
Parker, Simon B.  1997.  Stories in Scripture and Inscriptions: Comparative Studies on Narratives in Northwest Semitic Inscriptions and the Hebrew Bible. Oxford: Oxford University Press.
Rabin, C.  1971.  "Semitic Languages," Encyclopaedia Judaica, volume 14, pp. 1149–57.
Rabin, C.  1991.  Semitic Languages (Jerusalem: Bialik). [in Hebrew]
Rainey, A. F.  1986 “The Ancient Hebrew Prefix Conjugation in the Light of Amarnah Canaanite,” Hebrew Studies 27:1-19.
Rainey, A. F.  1990.  “The Prefix Conjugation Patterns of Early Northwest Semitic,” pp. 407–420 in Abusch, Tz., Huehnergard, J. and Steinkeller, P., eds.  Lingering over Words, Studies in Ancient Near Eastern Literature in Honor of William L. Moran.  Atlanta:  Scholars.
Renz, J.  1995.  Handbuch der althebräischen Epigraphik.  3 volumes.  Darmstadt.
Vaughn, A.  1999  “Palaeographic Dating of Judean Seals and Its Significance for Biblical Research,” BASOR 313:43-64.
Suchard, B. 2019 "The Development of the Biblical Hebrew Vowels: Including a Concise Historical Morphology" Brill p.37-50, 232-252

 
Languages attested from the 14th century BC
1908 introductions
1900s neologisms
Central Semitic languages